The Old Post Office (NRHP-listed as Watertown Post Office) is a historic building located at 26 South Broadway in Watertown, South Dakota. 

The Watertown Post Office was built in 1908 and served until 1976. From 1976 to 2009, it was known as Old Post Office Square, and housed several tenants. From 2009 to 2014 it was home to KXLG in Watertown.  It is currently the law office of Nancy Turbak Berry. 

The building was added to the National Register of Historic Places in 1976.

References

National Register of Historic Places in Codington County, South Dakota
Buildings and structures in Watertown, South Dakota